The Union Chargeability Act 1865 (28 & 29 Vict. c 79) was an Act of the Parliament of the United Kingdom that was passed after the Poor Law Amendment Act 1834. Under that Act, parishes were to group together to form unions so that the cost of building expensive workhouses was shared - the Union Chargeability Act 1865 was passed so that the financial burden of paupers was shared on a union-wide basis rather than a parish-wide basis.

References

Citations

Notes

Further reading
The Union Chargeability Act 1865. Printed by George Edward Eyre and William Spottiswoode, Printers to the Queen's most excellent Majesty. London. 1865. At pages 721 to 724 of A Collection of the Public General Statutes passed in the Twenty-eighth and Twenty-ninth Years of the Reign of Her Majesty Queen Victoria. Printed by George Edward Eyre and William Spottiswoode, Printers to the Queen's most excellent Majesty. London. 1865.
William Cunningham Glen. Villiers' Union Chargeability Act, 1865; with an Introduction and Commentary; also, The Practice of Poor Removals, Adapted to the Removal of Union Poor. Second Edition. Shaw and Sons. Fetter Lane, London. 1866.

United Kingdom Acts of Parliament 1865
Poverty in the United Kingdom
Poor Law in Britain and Ireland